Sir John Allot (or Allott) was a 16th-century English merchant and politician who served as Lord Mayor of London. He was the fourth son of a Lincolnshire squire, Richard Allot of Great Lymber. He came to London and joined the Worshipful Company of Fishmongers. He was elected in 1580 as one of the Sheriffs of London, serving with Ralph Woodcock, and in 1590 he was elected Lord Mayor of London. He did not finish his term, though. 

He died on 17 September 1591  and was buried at St Margaret Moses; the remainder of his term was served by Sir Rowland Hayward (as his second term). He had a daughter, Margaret, who married William Albany of Oxsted. Another daughter, Anne, married Thomas Pigott, MP, and secondly Sir John Gibson, MP.

References

16th-century lord mayors of London
1591 deaths
16th-century English businesspeople
16th-century English politicians
Year of birth uncertain
Sheriffs of the City of London
Knights Bachelor